William Deng Nhial (1929 - 5 May 1968) was the political leader of the Sudan African National Union, SANU, from 1962 to 1968. He was elected unopposed. He was one of founders of the Anya Nya Military Wing of the Liberation of Southern Sudan, fighting for the independence of Southern Sudan. He was ambushed and killed by Sudan's army on 9 May 1968 at Cueibet, on his way from Rumbek to Tonj. The Sudan government denied having authorised the assassination. Although no investigation was conducted, eyewitnesses at Cueibet village and SANU investigation committee confirmed the assassins to be the Sudan army.

Background

William Deng was of Dinka origin, and was born in Tonj, then in Bahr al-Ghazal Provinc.
He joined the government as an administrator.
William Deng believed in Pan-African Democratic Socialism, and in solidarity with African Sudanese in resistance to Arab colonialism. He aimed for political partnership with indigenous African Sudanese people of Nuba, Fur, Beja, Nubia, Ingesenia and other parts of northern Sudan. These African groups formed the Congress of New Forces,CNF, in the Constituent Assembly in 1967/68, to oppose the Government of the then Prime Minister, Mohamed Ahmed Mahagoup of the Umma party.

Exile

Some time after the army took power in 1958, William Deng fled into exile, as did other southern politicians including Fr. Saturnino Ohure, Joseph Oduho and Alexis Bakumba.
Saturnino Ohure and Joseph Oduho moved from Uganda to Kinshasa, Democratic Republic of Congo, where they were joined by William Deng and founded the Sudan African Closed Districts National Union (SACDNU).
William Deng was appointed Secretary-General of SACNDU in 1962.
William Deng and Joseph Oduho co-authored the first book ever in 1962: "The Problem of the Southern Sudan." In that book, they declared arms struggle for independence of Southern Sudan from the minority Arab dominated, colonial government of Khartoum/Sudan.

The exiles moved back to Kampala in Uganda in 1963, with the movement renamed the Sudan African National Union (SANU).
The new name was designed to show solidarity with other African nationalist movements of the period.
In Kampala SANU became the voice of the 60,000 refugees who had fled to camps in the Democratic Republic of Congo and Uganda, but was unable to establish a political presence in Sudan.
The SANU leaders did manage to organize the military Wing of SANU, the Anya Nya, which began operating in Southern Sudan in 1963, conducting guerilla raids and largely responsible for military operations and targets.

William Deng was responsible for the Bahr al-Ghazal insurgents, that launched heavy military attacked on Sudan's military garrison at Wau in January 1964.
That  Anya Nya force was led commanded by Col. Bernadino Mou Mou. In that operations, over twelve Sudan's army soldiers were killed, and many automatic weapons were captured. Those military activities posed a serious security threat and putting its weight behind the civilian demonstrations which were steadily challenging and eroding the alreading crumbling military government.
In response to mounting pressure, the military ruler Major General Ibrahim Abboud, announced his resignation and opened way to civilian rule, beginning from 21 October 1964. The new civilian provional government, led by Prime Minister, Al Sir Al Khatim Al Khalifa, backed all political parties, North and South, declared freedom of speech and association, thus allowing political parties to operate. The government called for peaceful solution to the "problem of Southern Sudan."

Return to Sudan

In February 1965, William Deng decided to return to Khartoum and register SANU. The other SANU leaders, led by Aggrey Jadien, rejected Deng's proposal and instead decided to continue outside Khartoum until total "independence is achieved." Thus causing a split of SANU into two factions, one inside Sudan and the other outside Sudan. William Deng organised and registered SANU inside Sudan, after which he became its President. Aggrey Jadein, on the other hand, became the leader of SANU outside.
SANU was formally registered as a political party in Sudan following a rally in Omdurman on 11 April 1965, which was heavily attended by 20,000 Southern and Northern Sudanese in the Capital.
The SANU and Southern Front, an organization which was formed in Khartoum by Southern Sudanese and led by Stanislaus Paysama, was not formally registered, but was politically operative. SANU was an active force in Sudanese politics for the next four years, advocating Federal system of government within united Sudan. The SANU in exile rejected Deng's moderated approach, and opted for separate independent Southern Sudan. The Southern Front, on their own, wanted a plebiscite to choose between autonomous rule, unity, federatl arrangement or secession.

The provisional government, led Prime Minister, Sir Al Khatim Al Khalifa, from 24 October 1964 to 15 June 1965, did hold the Round Table Peace Conference on the "problem of Southern Sudan."  The Conference was attended by the Northern political parties of the Umma, National Unionist Party, NUP, Islamic Charter Front (NIF), Sudan Communist Party, SCP, and others. For Southern Sudan political parties, the attendees were: SANU Inside, SANU outside, led by William Deng and Aggrey Jaddien,respectively, and the  Southern Front, led by Clement Mboro. The Conference was also attended by African observers from Egypt, Uganda, Kenya and Ethiopia. The conference failed. Northern parties, as they did in 1946 conference on the South, 1956 declaration of Sudan's independence and 1958 inside the Constituent Assembly (Sudan's parliament), rejected various demands proposed by the Southern parties. To face safe the conference, the North and South agreed to continue consultations by forming a twelve-man committee to consider and study what they called "local autonomy." It couldn't work. Thus making Northern parties to call for general elections for May 1965.

The optimism in the south for return to democracy, was quickly aborted. Provision Prime Minister Sir Al Khatim Al Khalifa called elections to be conducted in May–June 1965 as demanded by the Northern political parties. The Southern parties, then SANU inside and Southern Front boycotted the elections. Nevertheless, the North went for partial elections, an exclusion of the South, which had become a political practice from 1946 to independence and beyond. Elections, despite the Southern boycott, was held in the North on time scheduled. The Umma and the NUP won.

The two parties opted for coalition government headed by the NUP President, Ismail Alzahry as president of the Supreme Council (five men's head of state membership) and Umm Prime Minister, Mohamed Ahmed Mahgoub, whose policy was to make war with Southern Sudan arms movement, the Anya Nya, and their supporters inside the country. The policy was approved by the Northern Constituent Assembly to proceed with war and persecution of educated Southern Sudanese in Southern Sudan and the North. As a result, Prime Minister Mahgoub committed massive massacre of educated and Chiefs in Wau, Juba and other towns on 9–15 July 1965.

Despite this, William Deng invested considerable time and efforts, trying to convince government leaders of the benefits of solving the north-south conflict. He pointed out the unwanted truth that the northern soldiers stationed in the south were in charge at daytime, brutal killers at night. If the stalemate were ended, military costs would drop and the south could supply the north with food, with surplus for export. He was not successful in his arguments.

Assassination

In the 1968 election, William Deng won his seat by a landslide, but was assassinated just as the results were announced.
Deng and others in his party were killed on 9 May 1968 in Cueibet County, Lakes State in a place that is now called William Bridge.
There was little doubt that the army was responsible, although the government accused the rebels. The government ordered an investigation, but never issued a report on what had happened. According to Muhammad Omar Bashir, "The murder of William Deng represented a great setback in North-South relations. Deng's decision to return to the Sudan in 1965 to attend the Round Table Conference and his participation in that event, in the Twelve-Man Committee, in the Political Parties Conference and in the National Constitution Commission had all made a positive contribution to the search for a solution of the Southern problem.

After his death, William Deng was buried in his home town in Tonj South County. Deng is now considered a national hero. However,  his grave fell into disrepair, partly used as a garbage site, partly for local breweries. In May 2011 residents in the immediate area of the grave were given one month's notice to leave so that the site could be cleaned up.
His son Nhial Deng Nhial later became a leading politician in the Sudanese People's Liberation Movement, and in December 2008 was appointed Minister for SPLA Affairs, or Defense Minister.

References

1968 deaths
People from Warrap (state)
Dinka people
South Sudanese politicians
Assassinated Sudanese people
Assassinated South Sudanese politicians
People murdered in Sudan
1929 births